The women's long jump at the 2012 African Championships in Athletics was held at the Stade Charles de Gaulle on 28 and 29 June.

Medalists

Records

Schedule

Results

Qualification
Qualifying perf. 6.25 (Q) or 12 best performers (q) advanced to the Final.

Final

References

Results

Long jump Women
Long jump at the African Championships in Athletics
2012 in women's athletics